Edward Tredcroft (15 December 1828 – 8 April 1888) was an English cricketer active from 1851 to 1865 who played for Sussex. He was born in Horsham and died in Westminster. He appeared in 53 first-class matches as a righthanded batsman who bowled slow underarm. He scored 759 runs with a highest score of 44 not out and took 11 wickets with a best performance of three in one innings. His own cricket ground played host to first-class cricket.

Family
Elder son of Henry Tredcroft (1788-1844), a Sussex landowner, and his wife Mary (1795-1872), daughter of Robert Hawgood Crew and widow of James Eversfield, he inherited the mansion and estate of Warnham Court when he was in his teens. In 1850 he married Theodosia Sophia (1821-1898), daughter of Edward Bligh and his wife Sophia, daughter of William Markwick.  Two of their children reached adulthood.

Notes

1828 births
1888 deaths
English cricketers
Sussex cricketers
Marylebone Cricket Club cricketers
Gentlemen of England cricketers
Gentlemen of Marylebone Cricket Club cricketers
Gentlemen of Kent and Sussex cricketers